Doyle is an unincorporated community in Jefferson Township, Miami County, in the U.S. state of Indiana.

History
Doyle had its start as a siding on the Lake Erie and Western Railroad. The community was named after the Doyle family of settlers.

References

Unincorporated communities in Miami County, Indiana
Unincorporated communities in Indiana